Tabar (also Romanized as Ţabar; also known as Tavār and Tīr) is a village in Tabar Rural District, Jolgeh Shoqan District, Jajrom County, North Khorasan Province, Iran. At the 2006 census, its population was 1,025, in 298 families.

References 

Populated places in Jajrom County